Radical 103 or radical bolt of cloth meaning "bolt of cloth" is one of the 23 Kangxi radicals (214 radicals in total) composed of 5 strokes. When appearing at the left side of a character, it transforms into .

In the Kangxi Dictionary, there are 15 characters (out of 49,030) to be found under this radical.

 is also the 118th indexing component in the Table of Indexing Chinese Character Components predominantly adopted by Simplified Chinese dictionaries published in mainland China, with  being its associated indexing component.

Evolution

Derived characters

Literature

External links

Unihan Database - U+758B

103
118